The Tram Line 1 of Budapest (in Hungarian: budapesti 1-es jelzésű villamosvonal) is a line operated by BKK Zrt., the transport authority of Budapest. It was commissioned in 1984 between Bécsi út / Vörösvári út and Lehel utca. It then has numerous extension phases, which in 2000 make it possible to connect north to south of Pest along the great ring road (Róbert Károly körút - Hungária körút - Könyves Kálmán körút), between the Árpád híd and Rákóczi híd bridges. Since March 2015, the line also crosses the Danube in its southern part, and it was further extended in 2019 to Kelenföld vasútállomás M. It now runs between Bécsi út / Vörösvári út and Kelenföld vasútállomás.

Line and Stations

References 

Budapest
Public transport in Budapest